Monique Holsey-Hyman is an American social worker, professor, and politician. Prior to her work in politics and academia, Holsey-Hyman worked as a social worker in New York City. She was a caseworker for the New York City Human Resources Administration, served as Director of the Intensive Care Management Program at the Steinway Child and Family Services Center of Queens, served as the Bronx Director of Case Management, and was the Center Director for the Community Healthcare Network. Holsey-Hyman also served as a consultant for Saint Vincent's Catholic Medical Centers, Brooklyn Hospital Center, and the New York City Housing Authority.

Since 2018, she serves on the faculty at North Carolina Central University, as the assistant professor of social work, and formerly served on the faculty as an adjunct professor at Berkeley College and as the curriculum coordinator and special assistant to the Vice President of Academic Affairs for Retention and Recruitment at Shaw University. In 2022, Holsey-Hyman was appointed to the Durham City Council.

Early life and education 
Holsey-Hyman is from the South Bronx in New York City. In 1986, she graduated with a Bachelor of Science degree in human services and sociology from Binghamton University. In 1992, she earned a Master of Social Work degree from the Columbia University School of Social Work. She obtained a Doctor of Education degree in administration and leadership from Walden University in 2015 and completed certification to administer psychotherapy in 2005.

Career

Social work
In 1986, Holsey-Hyman became a caseworker for the New York City Human Resources Administration and the Child Welfare Administration. In 1995, she worked for the not-for-profit areana at Steinway Child and Family Services in Queens, New York. She later served as Steinway's director for the Intensive Care Management Program.

Holsey-Hyman became a certified social worker in New York in 1996 and was promoted to the role of Bronx Director of Case Management. In 2002, she became the Center Director for the Community Healthcare Network in Queens. She worked in direct clinical practice and administrative positions in social work for twenty-five years before working in academic instruction and accrediation in higher education.

She also worked as a consultant for Saint Vincent's Catholic Medical Centers, Brooklyn Hospital Center, and the New York City Housing Authority.

Academia 
In 2005, Holsey-Hyman began working in higher education as an adjunct professor in the Liberal Arts Department at Berkeley College in New York. After teaching at Berkeley, Holsey-Hyman moved to North Carolina to work in academic administration at Shaw University, a historically black college in Raleigh. At Shaw, she served as curriculum coordinator, special assistant to the vice president of Academic Affairs for Retention and Recruitment, and worked to accredit and implement the university's Bachelor of Social Work program.

In 2016, Holsey-Hyman joined the faculty at North Carolina Central University, and became assistant professor in the Department of Social Work in 2018. She served on the university's Quality Education Plan Committee, the Faculty Senate, and multiple committees in the social work department. Holsey-Hyman also serves as the faculty co-advisor for Phi Alpha.

In 2017, she was awarded a Woman of the Year Honors by Spectacular Magazine for her work in education.

Politics 
In 2022, Holsey-Hyman was selected to finish the Durham City Council term of Councilman Charlie Reece, who resigned to move to Paris. She was selected unanimously out of over twently candidates who applied to fill the vacant seat in the city council. She was sworn into office on May 11, 2022.

She was appointed by Mayor Elaine O'Neal to serve on the Affordable Housing Implementation Committee, the Citizens Advisory Committee, the Durham-Chapel Hill-Orange Work Group, the Council Legislative Committee, the Northeast Central Durham Subcommittee, the Recreation Advisory Commission, Sister Cities of Durham, and the Upper Neuse River Basin Association Board of Directors. She was also appointed by O'Neal to serve as an alternate on the Homeless Services Advisory Committee, the Human Relations Committee, the Joiny-City County Committee, and the Triangle J Council of Government's Center of the Region Enterprises committee.

Holsey-Hyman also serves as an appointed member of the community organization HBCUgrowBoard.

References 

Living people
20th-century births
Year of birth missing (living people)
21st-century American women politicians
21st-century African-American politicians
21st-century American politicians
African-American city council members in North Carolina
African-American women academic administrators
African-American women academics
African-American women in politics
American social workers
Binghamton University alumni
Columbia University School of Social Work alumni
Durham, North Carolina City Council members
North Carolina Central University faculty
North Carolina Democrats
Politicians from the Bronx
Shaw University faculty
Social work scholars
Walden University people
Women city councillors in North Carolina